"May the Force be with you" is an iconic expression from the Star Wars movies. It may also refer to:

 "May the Force Be with You" (Only Fools and Horses), an episode of the BBC sitcom Only Fools and Horses
 "May the Force Be With You", a song on the album Hydrophonic by The Soup Dragons
 "May the Force Be with You Always", a song by American country music artist Tom T. Hall